Skilesville is an unincorporated community in Muhlenberg County, Kentucky, United States.

History
A post office called Skilesville was established in 1878, and remained in operation until 1907. The community was named for James Skiles, a riverboat operator.

References

Unincorporated communities in Muhlenberg County, Kentucky
Unincorporated communities in Kentucky